The National Directorate for Migration (DNM) is a decentralised agency of the Government of Argentina responding to the Ministry of the Interior which is responsible for handling the country's migration policies.

It was created in 1949, during the first presidency of Juan Domingo Perón, to expand upon the responsibilities of the previously existing Immigration Directorate. It initially operated under the scope of the Secretariat of Labour.

Its headquarters are located in the Hotel de Inmigrantes complex, in the Retiro district of Buenos Aires. In the early 20th century, the Hotel de Inmigrantes served as the first stop for the millions of migrants coming to Argentina from Europe and Asia. Today, in addition to the DNM, the building houses two museums and a cultural centre.

Structure and organisation
The DNM possesses jurisdiction throughout Argentina. In addition to its central headquarters and peripheral mobile units, it consists of 29 offices known as "delegations" (from the Spanish, delegaciones) and 7 additional migration offices. The mobile units are intended for express documentation and minor bureaucratic procedures. With the exception of Santa Fe Province, where the DNM delegation is located in Rosario (rather than its capital city of Santa Fe), delegations are positioned in each capital city, throughout the 23 provinces of Argentina. There are also delegations located in other major cities such as Comodoro Rivadavia, Bariloche, and Puerto Iguazú.

Chief tasks and responsibilities of the DNM include controlling the entry and departure of non-Argentine citizens to and from the Argentine territory, granting residency permits to immigrants, and standardising the documentation of immigrants in Argentina. The DNM consists of seven general directorates: Administration, Immigration, Migratory Movement, Systems and Information Technologies, Technical and Legal Affairs, Institutional and Social Affairs, as well as Migration Information, Analysis and Control.

See also
Immigration to Argentina

References

External links
 (in Spanish)

Government agencies of Argentina
1949 establishments in Argentina
Government agencies established in 1949